is an Autobahn in Germany. It is noncontiguous and split in several parts in the state of North Rhine-Westphalia, an extension to Kassel in Hesse was planned but has been abandoned.

Exit list

|-
|colspan="2" style="text-align:Center;"| N297
| Netherlands
|-
|colspan="3"|

 
 

  
|-
|colspan="3"|

|-
|colspan="3"|

 Neheim 

|}

External links 
 

46
A046